Jagadishpur is a census town in Bally Jagachha CD Block of Howrah Sadar subdivision in Howrah district in the Indian state of West Bengal. It is a part of Kolkata Urban Agglomeration.

Jagadishpur is under the jurisdiction of Liluah Police Station of Howrah City Police.

Geography

Demographics

As per 2011 Census of India Jagadishpur had a total population of 16,259, of which 8,337 (51%) were males and 7,922 (49%) were females. Population below 6 years was 1,634. The total number of literates in Jagdishpur was 12,498 (85.46% of the population over 6 years).

Transport

Benaras Road (part of State Highway 15) is the artery of the town. Besides Domjur-Jagadishpur Road connects the locality with Domjur.

Bus

Private Bus
 57A (Chanditala — Howrah Station)

Mini Bus
 30 (Baluhati — Esplanade)

Train
Kona railway station is the nearest railway station on Howrah-Amta line. The nearest railway junction is Dankuni railway station on Howrah-Bardhaman chord line.

References

External links

Cities and towns in Howrah district
Neighbourhoods in Kolkata
Kolkata Metropolitan Area